Volodymyr Ferents was born on 12 July 1984 in Lviv, Ukraine) and is a Ukrainian football defender. He is 183 centimeters tall (6'0"). He weighs 70 kilograms (154.3 pounds).

Club history
He has played for FC Kremin Kremenchuk in the Druha Liha B franchise for 2006–07 and first half of 2007–08 seasons. The rest of 2007–08 he played for FC Lviv. For 2008–09 season he plays for FC Arsenal Bila Tserkva.
He also played for FC Karpaty Lviv, FC Dynamo Lviv, FC Vorskla Poltava and PFC Olexandria clubs.

References

1984 births
Living people
FC Kremin Kremenchuk players
Ukrainian footballers
FC Vorskla Poltava players
FC Lviv players
Association football defenders
Sportspeople from Lviv